Krystyna Szymańska-Lara (born 30 September 1969, in Nidzica) is a Polish former basketball player who competed in the 2000 Summer Olympics.

Achievements

Based on

unless otherwise noted.

Team

 7-time Belgian champion (2002–2007, 2009)
 Vice Champion of Poland (1999)
 Bronze medalist of the Polish Championships (1998, 2000)
 8-time Belgian Cup winner (2002–2009)
 Polish Cup finalist (1991)

Individual

 PLKK female shooter leader (1997)
 Selected to the first squad of the European Championships (1999)

National team

 European Champion (1999)
 Participant:
  Championship:
   Europe (1991 - 6th place, 1999, 2003 - 4th place)
   Europe U-18 (1988 - 8th place)
 Olympic Games (2000 – 8th)

References

External links
Profile at fibaeurope.com
Profile at eurobasket.com

1969 births
Living people
Polish women's basketball players
Olympic basketball players of Poland
Basketball players at the 2000 Summer Olympics
People from Nidzica
Sportspeople from Warmian-Masurian Voivodeship